The Song Remains Insane is the tenth album by Dread Zeppelin, released in 1996. It is a double live album from their tour recorded in Paris, Tokyo, Sydney, Copenhagen and Las Vegas.

The CD insert has texts from Paul Elliot (Sounds UK), Jah Paul Jo (Halvallah 1996), and a quote from Frank Zappa “Art is about making something out of nothing and selling it”.

Track listing
Disc one – titled "The Song Remains Insane"
"Black Dog" (Page, Plant, Jones) – 7:05
"Whole Lotta Love" (Page, Plant, Jones, Bonham) – 5:59
"Heartbreaker" (Page, Plant, Jones, Bonham) – 9:03
"Do The Claw" (Ramsay, Putnam, Tortell, Haasis) – 2:27
"Song Remains The Same" (Page, Plant) – 6:02
"Your Time Is Gonna Come" (Page, Jones) – 7:46
"In Through The Ed Door" (Traditional) – 1:19
"Stairway to Heaven" (Page, Plant) – 10:04

Disc two – titled "The 'Live On Strawberry Cheesecake' Sessions"
"See See Rider" (?) – 1:27
"Immigrant Song" (Page, Plant) – 3:43
"Black Dog" (Page, Plant, Jones) – 8:00
"Heartbreaker" (Page, Plant, Jones) – 5:57
"Do The Claw" (Ramsay, Putnam, Tortell, Haasis) – 3:02
"Big Ol' Gold Belt" (Ramsay, Putnam, Tortell, Haasis) – 3:35
"Viva Las Vegas" (Pomas, Shuman) – 0:45
"Woodstock" (Mitchell) – 4:09
"Looking' For Trouble" (Dread Zeppelin) – 0:20
"Rock'N'Roll Medley": "Rock & Roll" (Page, Plant), "The Ocean" (Page, Plant), "D'yer Mak'er" (Page, Plant, Jones, Bonham), "In the Light" (Page, Plant, Jones), "Dazed & Confused" (Page), "Nobody's Fault" (Page, Plant), "Bring It On Home" (Page, Plant) – 11:16
"Plant Chat" (N/A) – 0:57
"A Quiet Moment With Tortelvis" (N/A) – 0:42
"Radio Montage" (N/A) – 4:35

The Players
 Jah Paul Jo - Guitar, Keyboard and Vocals
 Tortelvis – That Beautiful singin’ voice 
 Ed Zeppelin – Congas, percussion, vocals and keys.
 Carl Jah – Guitars, vocals
 Put-Mon - Bass
 Charlie Haj - is the man that hands Tortelvis his water and towel on stage.

Production
 Producers: Jah Paul Jo and Rasta Li-Mon
 Engineered by: Rasta Li-Mon
 On-site Engineering supervised by Rasta Li-Mon and Darrel Bussino by: Rasta Li-Mon
 Cover Design and Artwork: Shelley Roye
Valuable contributions: Lee Manning and Alan Grange.

Notes 

Dread Zeppelin albums
1996 live albums
I.R.S. Records live albums